Markowicz is a Polish-language surname of East Slavic origin. It is a patronymic surname derived from the given name Mark. The East Slavic spelling is Markovich. Notable people with the surname include:

 (born 1960) French translator and poet
Artur Markowicz (872-1934), Polish artist
 (1902-1985), Polish historian, Communist activist and mayor of security service 
 (1933-1974), Polish chemist and geologist
 (1927–2010), Polish politician and MP

See also
Markowitz (disambiguation)
Markiewicz
Markovič
Marković
Markovics
Markovits
Markov

Polish-language surnames
Patronymic surnames